Akpatok Island is one of the uninhabited Canadian Arctic islands in the Qikiqtaaluk Region of Nunavut, Canada. It is the largest island in Ungava Bay on the northern coast of Quebec. The island is named for the Akpat, the thick-billed murre (Uria lomvia), which live on ledges along the limestone cliffs surrounding the island.

Geography

Fauna

Akpatok Island has International Biological Program status. It is a Canadian Important Bird Area (#NU007), as well as a Key Migratory Bird Terrestrial Habitat site (NU Site 50). In addition to the thick-billed murre, notable bird species include black guillemot and peregrine falcon.

Polar bear, seal, and walrus are common in the area.

History
At the southern end of the island there are remains of a Dorset settlement. The island is known for its widespread cannibalism which ended around 1900 as the inhabitants moved to the mainland. Skulls and human remains have been reported on the island, but the accuracy of these reports can be called into question as there is an abundance of mystery and legend surrounding the details of the island. In July 1971 an exploratory oil well was drilled on the island, yet all that remains are a few dilapidated shelters and rusted equipment.

References

External links
  at oceandots.com
 Satellite Photograph from USGS
 Akpatok Island in the Atlas of Canada - Toporama; Natural Resources Canada

Uninhabited islands of Qikiqtaaluk Region
Important Bird Areas of Qikiqtaaluk Region
Seabird colonies
Cannibalism in North America

Incidents of cannibalism